Frank Trevor Denton (born October 27, 1930), is a Canadian economist.  He is Professor Emeritus in the Department of Economics at McMaster University in Hamilton, Ontario, Canada. His published work includes contributions to applied econometrics, population economics, labour economics, health economics, energy economics, and demography.

Education and Honors 

 University of Toronto: B.A., 1952; M.A., 1954
 Honorary LL.D., McMaster University, 2008
 Elected Fellow, American Statistical Association, 1979
 Elected Fellow, Royal Society of Canada, 1984
 Elected Member, International Statistical Institute, 1982

Career 

Denton’s first professional position, 1953 to 1954, was with the Government of Ontario’s Bureau of Statistics and Research, in Toronto. From 1954 to 1959, and again from 1961 to 1968, he held various positions with the Dominion Bureau of Statistics (later renamed Statistics Canada), the final one being Director, Research and Econometrics Staff. (In 1959 he had taken a job as an economist with Philips Electronics Industries Limited, in Toronto, but left it in 1960 to work for the Special Committee of the Senate on Manpower and Employment, before returning to the Bureau in 1961). During the period 1964 to 1968, concurrently with his appointment at the Bureau, he served also as research consultant to the Economic Council of Canada. He moved to McMaster University in 1968 as Professor in the Department of Economics, and was Director of the Program (later Research Institute) for Quantitative Studies in Economics and Population from 1981 to 1996. He became Professor Emeritus in 1996.

Publications

Selected journal articles 

 Frank T. Denton, 1963. "Some Techniques for Analysing a Set of Time Series Subject to a Linear Restriction," Journal of the American Statistical Association, vol. 58(302), pp. 513–518.
 Frank T. Denton and John Kuiper, 1965. “The Effect of Measurement Errors on Parameter Estimates and Forecasts: A Case Study Based on the Canadian Preliminary National Accounts,” Review of Economics and Statistics, vol. XLVII(2), pp. 198-206.
 Frank T. Denton, 1971. “Adjustment of Monthly or Quarterly Series to Annual Totals: An Approach Based on Quadratic Minimization,” Journal of the American Statistical Association, vol. 66(333), pp. 99-102.
 Frank T. Denton and Ernest H. Oksanen, 1972. “A Multi-Country Analysis of the Effects of Data Revisions on an Econometric Model,” Journal of the American Statistical Association, vol. 67(338), pp. 286-291.
 Frank T. Denton and Byron G. Spencer, 1973. “A Simulation Analysis of the Effects of Population Change on a Neo-classical Economy,” Journal of Political Economy, vol. 81(2, part 1), pp. 356-375.
 Frank T. Denton, 1973. "A Simulation Model of Month-to-Month Labour Force Movement in Canada," International Economic Review, vol. 14(2), pp. 293–311.
 Frank T. Denton and Ernest H. Oksanen, 1973. "Data Revisions and Forecasting Accuracy: An Econometric Analysis Based on Preliminary and Revised National Accounting Estimates," Review of Income and Wealth, series 19(4), pp. 437–452.
 Frank T. Denton and Ernest H. Oksanen, 1973. "Measurement Error and Choice of Econometric Estimation Method: Some Empirical Findings," International Statistical Review, vol. 41(3), pp. 343–349.
 Frank T. Denton and Byron G. Spencer, 1974. "Some Demographic Consequences of Changing Cohort Fertility Patterns: An Investigation Using the Gompertz Function," Population Studies, vol. 28(2), pp. 309–318.
 Frank T. Denton and Byron G. Spencer, 1974. "Some Aspects of Economic Adjustments through Migration Flows," Economic Journal, vol. 84(336), pp. 868–885.
 Frank T. Denton and Byron G. Spencer, 1975. “Health-Care Costs When the Population Changes,” Canadian Journal of Economics, vol. VIII(1), pp. 34-48.
 Frank T. Denton and Byron G. Spencer, 1976. "Household and Population Effects on Aggregate Consumption," Review of Economics and Statistics, vol. LVIII(1), pp. 86–95.
 Frank T. Denton, 1978. "Single-Equation Estimators and Aggregate Restrictions When Equations Have the Same Sets of Regressors," Journal of Econometrics, vol. 8(2), pp. 173–179.
 Frank T. Denton, 1985. “Data Mining as an Industry,” Review of Economics and Statistics, vol. LXVII(1), pp. 124-127.
 Frank T. Denton, 1985. "The Effect of Professional Advice on the Stability of a Speculative Market," Journal of Political Economy, vol. 93(5), pp. 977–993.
 Frank T. Denton, 1987. "The Power Function of a Published Hypothesis Test," Economics Letters, vol. 25(2), pp. 101–104.
 Frank T. Denton and Byron G. Spencer, 1989. "Macro-Effects of Changes in Household Preferences for Children: Simulated History and Future Time Paths," Journal of Population Economics, vol. 2(3), pp. 165–188.
 Frank T. Denton, 1990. "The Effects of Publication Selection on Test Probabilities and Estimator Distributions," Risk Analysis, vol. 10(1), pp. 131–136.
 Frank T. Denton and Byron G. Spencer, 1992. "Resampling a Time Series Process: A Method of Estimating the Probabilities Associated with Alternative Plans for Protecting Pensions Against Inflation," Journal of Applied Econometrics, vol. 6(3), pp. 303–314. Also, "Erratum," vol. 7(2), 1992 (to correct journal printing errors).
 Frank T. Denton, A. Leslie Robb, and Byron G. Spencer, 1993. "An Econometric Analysis of Housing as Both a Consumption Good and a Risky Asset," Empirical Economics, vol. 18(2), pp. 215–231.
 Frank T Denton, Christine H. Feaver, and Byron G. Spencer, 1994. "Teachers and the Birth Rate: The Demographic Dynamics of a Service Population," Journal of Population Economics, vol. 7(3), pp. 307–329.
 Frank T. Denton, Christine H. Feaver, Dean C. Mountain, A. Leslie Robb, and Byron G. Spencer, 1996. "Industry-Region Load Profiles: Econometric Estimation Based on Marginal Totals," Annals of Regional Science, vol. 30(2), pp. 223–246.
 Frank T. Denton, Christine H. Feaver, and Byron G. Spencer, 1998. "Student Enrollment and Faculty Renewal: The Response of a Tenure-Based University to Demographic and Budgetary Shocks," Journal of Economic Behavior and Organization, vol. 34(1), pp. 101–127.
 Frank T. Denton and Byron G. Spencer, 1999. "How Old is Old? Revising the Definition Based on Life Table Criteria," Mathematical Population Studies, vol. 7(2), pp. 147–159.
 Frank T. Denton, Dean C. Mountain, and Byron G. Spencer, 1999. "Age, Trend, and Cohort Effects in a Macro Model of Canadian Expenditure Patterns," Journal of Business and Economic Statistics, vol. 17(4), pp. 430–443.
 Frank T. Denton and Dean C. Mountain, 2001. "Income Distribution and Aggregation/Disaggregation Biases in the Measurement of Consumer Demand Elasticities," Economics Letters, vol. 73, pp. 21–28.
 Frank T. Denton, Amiram Gafni, and Byron G. Spencer, 2002. “Exploring the Effects of Population Change on the Costs of Physician Services,” Journal of Health Economics, vol. 21(5), pp. 781-803.  
 Frank T. Denton, Dean C. Mountain, and Byron G. Spencer, 2003. "Energy Demand with Declining Rate Schedules: An Econometric Model for the U.S. Commercial Sector," Land Economics, vol. 79(1), pp. 86–105.
 Frank T. Denton, Christine H. Feaver, and Byron G. Spencer, 2005. "Time Series Analysis and Stochastic Forecasting: An Econometric Study of Mortality and Life Expectancy," Journal of Population Economics, vol. 18(2), pp. 203–227.
 Frank T. Denton, Dean C. Mountain, and Byron G. Spencer, 2006. "Errors of Aggregation and Errors of Specification in a Consumer Demand Model: A Theoretical Note," Canadian Journal of Economics, vol. 39(4), pp. 1398–1407.
 Frank T. Denton, Dean C. Mountain, and Byron G. Spencer, 2006. "Age, Retirement, and Expenditure Patterns: An Econometric Study of Older Households," Atlantic Economic Journal, vol. 34, pp. 189–218.
 Frank T. Denton, Amiram Gafni, and Byron G. Spencer, 2009. "Users and Suppliers of Physician Services: A Tale of Two Populations," International Journal of Health Services, vol. 39(1), pp. 189–218.
 Frank T. Denton and Byron G. Spencer, 2011. "A Dynamic Extension of the Period Life Table," Demographic Research, vol. 24(34), pp. 831–854.
 Frank T. Denton and Dean C. Mountain, 2011. "Exploring the Effects of Aggregation Error in the Estimation of Consumer Demand Elasticities," Economic Modelling, vol. 28(4), pp. 1747–1755.
 Frank T. Denton and Dean C. Mountain, 2011. "Taxing a Commodity with and without Revenue Neutrality: An Exploration Using a Calibrated Consumer Equilibrium Model," Atlantic Economic Journal, vol. 39(3), pp. 261–271.

Selected books and monographs 

 Frank T. Denton and Sylvia Ostry, 1967. Historical Estimates of the Canadian Labour Force, 1961 Census Monograph Series, Dominion Bureau of Statistics: Ottawa.
 Frank T. Denton and Sylvia Ostry, 1969. Working Life Tables for Canadian Males, 1961 Census Monograph Series, Dominion Bureau of Statistics: Ottawa.
 Frank T. Denton, 1970. The Growth of Manpower in Canada, 1961 Census Monograph Series: Ottawa.
 Frank T. Denton and Byron G. Spencer, 1975. Population and the Economy, Saxon House, D. C. Heath Ltd.: Westmead, Farnborough, Hants., England.
 Frank T. Denton, Christine H. Feaver, and A. Leslie Robb, 1976. The Short-Run Dynamics of the Canadian Labour Market, Economic Council of Canada: Ottawa.
 Frank T. Denton, A. Leslie Robb, and Byron G. Spencer, 1980. Unemployment and Labour Force Behaviour: Evidence from Canada and Ontario, University of Toronto Press: Toronto.
 Frank T. Denton, Melvin L. Kliman, and Byron G. Spencer, 1981. Pensions and the Economic Security of the Elderly, C. D. Howe Institute: Montreal.
 Frank T. Denton, Deborah A. Fretz, and Byron G. Spencer (editors), 2000. Independence and Economic Security in Old Age, UBC Press: Vancouver.

References

External links 
 Frank Denton -- Faculty of Social Sciences, McMaster University
 IDEAS/RePEc (Research Papers in Economics): Frank T. Denton
 McMaster Research Institute: QSEP

Fellows of the American Statistical Association
Fellows of the Royal Society of Canada
1930 births
Living people
Canadian economists
People from Toronto